S.O.S. is a traditional Swedish appetizer. It stands for "smör, ost och sill", which describes its main ingredients: butter, cheese and herring. It is usually eaten with schnapps Akvavit.

References

Appetizers
Swedish cuisine